Communauté d'agglomération Rambouillet Territoires is the communauté d'agglomération, an intercommunal structure, centred on the city of Rambouillet. It is located in the Yvelines department, in the Île-de-France region, northern France. Created in 2017, its seat is in Rambouillet. Its area is 629.5 km2. Its population was 79,127 in 2019, of which 27,141 in Rambouillet proper.

Composition
The communauté d'agglomération consists of the following 36 communes:

Ablis
Allainville
Auffargis
Boinville-le-Gaillard
La Boissière-École
Bonnelles
Les Bréviaires
Bullion
La Celle-les-Bordes
Cernay-la-Ville
Clairefontaine-en-Yvelines
Émancé
Les Essarts-le-Roi
Gambaiseuil
Gazeran
Hermeray
Longvilliers
Mittainville
Orcemont
Orphin
Orsonville
Paray-Douaville
Le Perray-en-Yvelines
Poigny-la-Forêt
Ponthévrard
Prunay-en-Yvelines
Raizeux
Rambouillet
Rochefort-en-Yvelines
Saint-Arnoult-en-Yvelines
Sainte-Mesme
Saint-Hilarion
Saint-Léger-en-Yvelines
Saint-Martin-de-Bréthencourt
Sonchamp
Vieille-Église-en-Yvelines

References

Rambouillet Territoires
Rambouillet Territoires